Adila is a village in Kohila Parish, Rapla County in northwestern Estonia.

Painter and graphic artist Kuno Veeber (1898–1929) was born in Adila Manor, as was actress and singer Laine Mesikäpp (1917–2012).

References

 

Villages in Rapla County
Kreis Harrien